Franklin Carnegie Library is an historic library building at 315 E Decherd in Franklin, Texas. Before 1913, the City of Franklin housed its 1,000 volume library in its city hall. The city applied for a grant from the Carnegie Corporation and $7,500 was awarded for the construction of a new library. The building was completed in 1914 but only served as a library through 1918. It was then used for school classes and civic activities though 1984. Currently, it houses the Robertson County Library. It added to the National Register of Historic Places on November 25, 2005.

See also

National Register of Historic Places listings in Robertson County, Texas
Recorded Texas Historic Landmarks in Robertson County

References

External links

Library buildings completed in 1914
Carnegie libraries in Texas
Education in Robertson County, Texas
Buildings and structures in Robertson County, Texas
Libraries on the National Register of Historic Places in Texas
National Register of Historic Places in Robertson County, Texas
Recorded Texas Historic Landmarks